José Victor Toledo (August 14, 1931 – February 3, 1980) was a United States district judge of the United States District Court for the District of Puerto Rico.

Education and career

Born in Arecibo, Puerto Rico, Toledo did his secondary studies at Colegio San José, received a Bachelor of Arts degree from the University of Florida in 1952 and a Bachelor of Laws from the University of Puerto Rico School of Law in 1955. He was a district judge of the Puerto Rico District Court in 1956. He was a First Lieutenant in the United States Army from 1956 to 1960 as a member of the Judge Advocate General's Corps, United States Army stationed at Fort Brooke in San Juan, Puerto Rico. He was an Assistant United States Attorney for the District of Puerto Rico from 1960 to 1961, entering private practice in San Juan from 1961 to 1970.

Federal judicial service

On November 16, 1970, Toledo was nominated by President Richard Nixon to a new seat on the United States District Court for the District of Puerto Rico created by 84 Stat. 294. He was confirmed by the United States Senate on November 25, 1970, and received his commission on December 1, 1970. He served as Chief Judge from 1974 until his death on February 3, 1980.

Honor and burial

In 1999, the Jose V. Toledo Federal Building and United States Courthouse at San Juan was named in his honor. He was buried at the Puerto Rico National Cemetery in Bayamón, Puerto Rico.

See also
List of Hispanic/Latino American jurists

References

Sources
 

1931 births
1980 deaths
Colegio San José alumni
Hispanic and Latino American judges
Judges of the United States District Court for the District of Puerto Rico
People from Arecibo, Puerto Rico
United States district court judges appointed by Richard Nixon
20th-century American judges
United States Army officers
University of Florida alumni
University of Puerto Rico alumni
Assistant United States Attorneys